A distiller performs distillation, often to produce alcohol.

Distiller or distillers may also refer to:

 Adobe Distiller, a software application
 Distillers Company, a former Scotch whisky and pharmaceutical company
 The Distillers, an Australian-American punk rock band
 The Distillers (EP), 1999
 The Distillers (album), 2000

See also